The Fair Political Practices Commission (FPPC) of California is a five-member independent nonpartisan commission that has primary responsibility for the impartial and effective administration of the Political Reform Act of 1974. The Commission's objectives are to ensure that public officials act in a fair and unbiased manner in the governmental decision-making process, to promote transparency in government, and to foster public trust in the political system.

The Commission is similar to the Federal Election Commission (FEC) in its campaign finance responsibilities. It differs from the FEC in its authority in lobbying and conflicts of interest.

It was created by California Proposition 9 in the June 1974 elections, known as the Political Reform Act of 1974, regulates campaign financing, conflicts of interest, lobbying, and governmental ethics.

Organization

List of Fair Political Practices Commissioner Chairs

See also
 Politics of California
 Campaign finance
 Conflict of Interest
 Lobbying in the United States
Nevada Commission on Ethics
New Mexico State Ethics Commission
Oklahoma Ethics Commission
Pennsylvania State Ethics Commission
Texas Ethics Commission
Wisconsin Ethics Commission

References

External links
 

Fair Political Practices Commission
Election commissions in the United States
Politics of California
Lobbying in the United States
1974 California elections